Konrad de la Fuente (born July 16, 2001), sometimes known as Konrad, is an American professional soccer player who plays as a winger for Super League Greece club Olympiacos, on loan from Ligue 1 club Marseille, and the United States national team.

Club career

Youth
Born in Miami, Florida, to Haitian parents of mixed Haitian-Dominican descent, Konrad moved to Spain at the age of 10 when his father took a job at the Haitian consulate in Barcelona. While playing for local youth side CF Damm, he was discovered and offered the chance to play for FC Barcelona. He developed in Barcelona's youth system after joining in 2013.

Barcelona B
Konrad made his debut for the reserves on December 1, 2018, coming off the bench and playing 12 minutes against Valencia Mestalla in the Segunda División B. He conceded a penalty in the final minutes of the game causing his side to go 2–1 down, but fellow teammate Ronald Araújo equalized late, ending the match 2–2.

He made his first start for the team on December 15, 2019, in a 3–1 win against La Nucía. He was replaced by Dani Morer in the 70th minute.

He scored his first goal for Barça B on February 2, 2020, a stoppage time winner in a 2–1 win against AE Prat, after coming on in the 81st minute.

Barcelona
On September 12, 2020, Konrad made his first team debut in a pre-season game against Gimnàstic Tarragona, in the process becoming the first American to play for Barcelona's first team. He made his official debut for Barcelona in the UEFA Champions League group stage match against Dynamo Kyiv on November 24, 2020, replacing Francisco Trincão in a 4–0 win. He appeared once again for Barça in the Champions League, coming off the bench again in a 3–0 away victory over Ferencváros, and later the following January in the Copa del Rey in a 2–0 away victory against Cornellà.

Marseille
On June 29, 2021, Konrad signed with Ligue 1 club Marseille, with Barcelona reserving the right to 50% of a future sale. He made his league debut on August 8 against Montpellier. He recorded his first assist in the same match on the first goal of a 3–2 comeback win.

Loan to Olympiacos
On August 13, 2022, Konrad was loaned to Olympiacos in Greece.

International career
Konrad has represented the United States at the under-16, under-18, and under-20 levels.
In July 2019, he was called up to the under-20 team for the 2019 FIFA U-20 World Cup in Poland. He started every match in the tournament until the United States was eliminated by Ecuador in the quarterfinals.

He received his first call up to the senior national team for friendly matches against Wales and Panama in November 2020. He made his debut on November 12, 2020, in the friendly against Wales as a starter and was replaced by Ulysses Llanez in the 71st minute.

Career statistics

Club

International

Honors
Barcelona
Copa del Rey: 2020–21

References

External links
FC Barcelona official profile
Olympique Marseille official profile
U.S. Soccer official profile
 

2001 births
Living people
Soccer players from Miami
American expatriate soccer players
Expatriate footballers in Spain
Expatriate footballers in France
Expatriate footballers in Greece
American expatriate sportspeople in Spain
American expatriate sportspeople in France
American expatriate sportspeople in Greece
American soccer players
American sportspeople of Haitian descent
American sportspeople of Dominican Republic descent
African-American soccer players
Association football forwards
CF Damm players
FC Barcelona Atlètic players
Konrad
Olympique de Marseille players
Olympiacos F.C. players
United States men's under-20 international soccer players
United States men's youth international soccer players
United States men's international soccer players
Segunda División B players
Ligue 1 players
21st-century African-American sportspeople